The 2012–13 Azadegan League was the 22nd season of the Azadegan League and 12th as the second highest division since its establishment in 1991. The season featured 19 teams from the 2011–12 Azadegan League, three new teams relegated from the 2011–12 Persian Gulf Cup: Shahin Bushehr, Shahrdari Tabriz and Mes Sarcheshmeh and four new teams promoted from the 2011–12 2nd Division: Esteghlal Ahvaz as champions, Gostaresh Foulad and Hafari Ahvaz. Alvand Hamedan replaced PAS Novin Hamedan, Bargh Shiraz replaced Steel Azin and Sang Ahan replaced Tarbiat Yazd. The league started on 13 September 2012 and ended on 16 April 2013. Gostaresh Foulad and Esteghlal Khuzestan won the Azadegan League title for the first time in their history. Gostaresh Foulad and Esteghlal Khuzestan promoted to the Persian Gulf Cup.

Changes

 At the end of 2011–12 Azadegan League season, Sanat Sari, Payam Mokhaberat, Kaveh, Bargh Shiraz were relegated to 2012–13 Iran Football's 2nd Division. 
 The four relegated teams were replaced by four 2011–12 Iran Football's 2nd Division winners. Esteghlal Ahvaz made an immediate return to Azadegan League. Hafari Ahvaz also promoted to Azadegan League. The two other promoted teams, Pas Novin and Gostaresh Foolad Sahand, were reserve teams of PAS Hamedan, and Gostaresh Foolad.
 Kaveh Tehran bought Gostaresh Foolad Sahand and returned to the Azadegan League.
 Pas Novin have changed their name and sponsorship to Alvand Hamedan, so they can remain in Azadegan League.
 Steel Azin come back from Semnan to Tehran.
 Sang Ahan Company bought Tarbiat Yazd and changed the name to Sang Ahan Bafq.
 Bargh Shiraz bought Steel Azin and return to Azadegan League.
 Yadavaran Shalamcheh bought Kaveh Tehran and came to the Azadegan League.

Match fixing scandal
After Shahrdari Tabriz promoted to the Iran Pro League, the former chairman of Niroye Zamini was announced that he was offered 100,000,000 tomans to fixing the match between two teams, a bid that he rejected. Two days later, one of the players of the Shahrdari Bandar Abbas was charged that he was purchased to score an own goal in match with Shahrdari Tabriz. IRIFF opened a case for the match-fixing scandal and excluded coaching staff and management of Shahrdari Tabriz temporarily. The play-off and championship matches was also postponed to another time until the final judgment. The final was announced on 13 May 2013. Shahrdari Tabriz's promotion was canceled and they will not be playing at Azadegan League next season too, Faraz Kamalvand (head coach of Shahrdari Tabriz) and his assistants were banned for two years from football careers. The team manager of Shahrdari Tabriz and chairman of the club were also banned for one year and six months. Yadavaran Shalamcheh (which relegated to the 2nd Division) was relegated to the 3rd Division. Nader Dastneshan (head coach of Saipa Shomal), Majid Bagherinia (head coach of Esteghlal Khuzestan) and chairman of the club.

Teams

Managerial changes

Standings

Group A

Group B

Play-off 
First leg was played on 28 May 2013; return leg on 30 May 2013

Pas Hamedan advanced to the Iran Pro League play-off against Zob Ahan.

Final 
The match was played on 31 May 2013

Iran Pro League Playoff 
The promotion/relegation playoff for 2013–14 Iran Pro League was held between Zob Ahan and Pas Hamedan.
The matches were played on 21 June 2013 and 26 June 2013

Zob Ahan remained in Iran Pro League.

Top scorers

Group A

Group B

References

Azadegan League seasons
Iran
2012–13 in Iranian football leagues